The provinces of Gabon are divided into forty-nine departments. The departments are listed below, by province (capitals in parentheses):

Estuaire Province
Komo Department (Kango)
Komo-Mondah Department (Ntoum)
Noya Department (Cocobeach)
Komo-Océan Department (Ndzomoe)
Libreville (department & capital city)

The Department of Cap Estérias (Cap Estérias) was deleted in 2013.

Haut-Ogooué Province
Djoue Department (Onga)
Djououri-Aguilli Department (Bongoville)
Lekoni-Lekori Department (Akiéni) 
Lekoko Department (Bakoumba) 
Leboumbi-Leyou Department (Moanda) 
Mpassa Department (Franceville) 
Plateaux Department (Leconi) 
Sebe-Brikolo Department (Okondja) 
Ogooué-Létili Department (Boumango)
Lékabi-Léwolo Department (Ngouoni)
Bayi-Brikolo Department (Aboumi)

Moyen-Ogooué Province

Abanga-Bigne Department (Ndjole) 
Ogooué et des Lacs Department (Lambaréné)

Ngounié Province
Boumi-Louetsi Department (Mbigou) 
Dola Department (Ndendé) 
Douya-Onoy Department (Mouila) 
Louetsi-Wano Department (Lébamba) 
Ndolou Department (Mandji) 
Ogoulou Department (Mimongo) 
Tsamba-Magotsi Department (Fougamou) 
Louetsi-Bibaka Department (Malinga)
Mougalaba Department (Guietsou)

Nyanga Province
Basse-Banio Department (Mayumba) 
Douigni Department (Moabi) 
Haute-Banio Department (Ndindi) 
Mougoutsi Department (Tchibanga) 
Doutsila Department (Mabanda)
Mongo Department (Binza)

Ogooué-Ivindo Province

Ivindo Department (Makokou) 
Lope Department (Booué) 
Mvoung Department (Ovan) 
Zadie Department (Mekambo)

Ogooué-Lolo Province
Lolo-Bouenguidi Department (Koulamoutou) 
Lombo-Bouenguidi Department (Pana) 
Mouloundou Department (Lastoursville) 
Offoué-Onoye Department (Iboundji)

Ogooué-Maritime Province

Bendje Department (Port-Gentil) 
Etimboue Department (Omboue) 
Ndougou Department (Gamba)

Woleu-Ntem Province

Haut-Komo Department (Medouneu) 
Haut-Ntem Department (Minvoul) 
Ntem Department (Bitam) 
Okano Department (Mitzic) 
Woleu Department (Oyem)

See also
 Provinces of Gabon

References

External links
 Statoids, Departments of Gabon

 
Subdivisions of Gabon
Gabon, Departments
Gabon 2
Departments, Gabon
Gabon geography-related lists